Muhammad ibn Ali as-Senussi (in full Muḥammad ibn ʿAlī al-Sanūsī al-Mujāhirī al-Ḥasanī al-Idrīsī) (1787–1859) was an Algerian Muslim theologian and leader who founded the Senussi mystical order in 1837. His militant mystical movement proved very significant and helped Libya to win its freedom from Italy on 10 February 1947. Omar Mukhtar was one of the most significant leaders of the Senussi military campaign launched by Muhammad ibn Ali as-Senussi. Al-Sanūsī's grandson Idrīs I ruled as king of Libya from 1951 to 1969.

Life
Al-Senussi was born in al-Wasita near Mostaganem, Algeria, and was named al-Senussi after a venerated Muslim teacher. He was a Berber of the Algerian Walad Sidi Abdallah tribe who claimed descent from the prophet Muhammad. The family takes its name from a religious Sheikh named Sanussi who lived in Tlemcen during the 13th century.

Unable to cross Algeria because of the French occupation, the beginning, the centre of Imam Mohammed Ali El Senussi's call was Jebel Akhdar and he built a mosque in Bayda of Cyrenaica and named it after himself, then he moved to Jaghbub in Cyrenaica from where the mosques spread to the remaining cities of Barqa and Tripoli.

He built a great mosque and a university, which was shut down on the orders of Muammar al-Gaddafi in 1984; at the same time, the graves and remains of the Senussi family were desecrated. After the death of Muhammad as-Sanussi his son Muhammad al-Mahdi as-Senussi (1859–1902) became the new leader of the Senussi order, and moved it south from Jaghbub to Kufra. His grandson through Muhammad became King Idris, the only King of Libya.

See also 
 Ahmad ibn Idris al-Fasi

References
S. Khuda Bukhsh, Studies Indian and Islamic, Routledge 2001, p. 28   (retrieved 26-09-2011)

Notes

Senussi dynasty
Algerian Sufis
1787 births
1859 deaths
People from Mostaganem Province
Al-Azhar University alumni
Muslims from the Ottoman Empire
Founders of Sufi orders
18th-century Arabs
19th-century Arabs